The 2019 MPBL Playoffs also known as the MPBL Datu Cup Playoffs, was the postseason tournament of the 2018–19 MPBL Datu Cup, the league's second overall, and the first under a new playoff format. The postseason tournament began on March 12, day after the end of regular season on March 11, 2019, and ended at the conclusion of the 2019 MPBL Datu Cup Finals. The 2019 MPBL Finals saw the Davao Occidental Tigers battled San Juan Knights for the national championship, with the Knights winning in five games, 3 games to 2.

Overview 
 The Batangas City Tanduay Athletics enter the year-long season as the defending champions, winning the 2018 MPBL Anta Rajah Cup championship.
 The Manila Stars were the first team in the season to qualify for the playoffs, as it is also their first playoff appearance.
 The Makati Super Crunch, San Juan Knights both made their first postseason appearances.
 Both the Bataan Risers and the Bulacan Kuyas earned their second playoff appearances.
 For the Southern Division, the Davao Occidental Tigers are the first team from the said division to qualify for the playoffs.

Format 
Within each division, the eight teams with the most wins qualify for the playoffs.

All brackets are fixed, there shall be no reseeding. The first three rounds of the playoffs are in a best-of-three series. A team that first earn two wins win the series and advances to the next round. The best-of-five series shall be played in the finals. The first team to win three games would win the championship. Not all games would be in a home-and-away format as the league implements a schedule which has two games played per game day, meaning, the second game only is the game which has the home-and-away basis. The venues might be different per series. But in the finals, the home-and-away basis will be observed with a 2–2–1 format. 

The top 4 teams will hold the homecourt advantage for the divisional playoffs. Additionally, the team with the league's best regular-season record will hold the advantage for the entire playoffs, including the MPBL Finals. For the first three rounds of the playoffs, the team with the homecourt advantage will host Games 1 and 3 (if necessary). For the Finals, the team with the better regular season record will hold the homecourt advantage and will host Games 1, 2, and 5 (if necessary) on its homecourt.

Playoff qualifying 
On January 7, 2019, the Manila Stars clinched the first berth for the playoffs, the earliest team who secured a playoff berth.

Northern Division

Southern Division

Bracket 
Teams in bold advanced to the next round. The numbers to the left of each team indicate the team's seeding in its division, and the numbers to the right indicate the number of games the team won in that round. Teams with home court advantage, the higher seeded team, are shown in italics.

First round

Northern Division

(N1) Bataan Risers vs. (N8) Caloocan Supremos 

This is the first playoff meeting between the Bataan Risers and the Caloocan Supremos.

(N2) Makati Super Crunch vs. (N7) Quezon City Capitals

This is the first playoff meeting between the Makati and the Quezon City.

(N3) San Juan Knights vs. (N6) Navotas Clutch 

This is the first playoff meeting between the San Juan Knights and the Navotas Clutch.

(N4) Manila Stars vs. (N5) Bulacan Kuyas 

This is the first playoff meeting between Kuyas and Stars.

Southern Division

(S1) Davao Occidental Tigers vs. (S8) Cebu City Sharks 

This is the first playoff meeting between the Davao Occidental Tigers and Cebu City Sharks.

(S2) Batangas City Athletics vs. (S7) Imus Bandera 

This is the first playoff meeting between the Batangas City Athletics and the Imus Bandera.

(S3) Muntinlupa Cagers vs. (S6) Zamboanga Valientes 

Allan Mangahas who earned 17 assists in the game, broke the previous record of 15 assists previously held jointly by Mikee Reyes and Bobby Ray Parks Jr. to become the league's newest record holder for most assists made in a single game.

This is the first playoff meeting between the Muntinlupa Cagers and the Zamboanga Valientes.

(S4) General Santos Warriors vs. (S5) Bacoor City Strikers 

This is the first playoff meeting between Bacoor City Strikers and the General Santos Warriors.

Divisional semifinals

Northern Division Semifinals

(N1) Bataan Risers vs. (N4) Manila Stars 

This is the first playoff meeting between the Manila Stars and the Bataan Risers.

(S7) Quezon City Capitals vs. (S3) San Juan Knights 

This is the first playoff meeting between San Juan Knights and Quezon City Capitals.

Southern Division Semifinals

(S1) Davao Occidental Tigers vs. (S5) Bacoor City Strikers

This is the first playoff meeting between the Bacoor City Strikers and the Davao Occidental Tigers.

(S2) Batangas City Athletics vs. (S6) Zamboanga Valientes 

This is the first playoff meeting between the Zamboanga Valientes and the Batangas City Athletics.

Divisional finals

Northern Division Finals: (N4) Manila Stars vs. (N3) San Juan Knights 

This is the first playoff meeting between the Manila Stars and the San Juan Knights.

Southern Division Finals: (S1) Davao Occidental Tigers vs. (S2) Batangas City Athletics 

This is the first playoff meeting between Davao Occidental Tigers and Batangas City Athletics.

MPBL Finals: (N3) San Juan Knights vs. (S1) Davao Occidental Tigers 
The San Juan Knights and the Davao Occidental Tigers will battle for the national championship to become the first ever Datu Cup Champion and the second MPBL Champions.

References 

Maharlika Pilipinas Basketball League
2019 in Philippine sport